Ambassador Bush may refer to:

 Dwight L. Bush Sr. (born 1957) U.S. Ambassador to Morocco (2014-2017)
 George H. W. Bush (1924-2018) U.S. Ambassador (1971-1975) ; to the United Nations (1971-1973) ; to the People's Republic of China (1974-1975)

See also
 President Bush (disambiguation)
 Governor Bush (disambiguation)
 Bush (disambiguation)